Hydroxynefazodone is a phenylpiperazine compound and a major metabolite of the antidepressant nefazodone. It has similar biological activity and a similar elimination half-life (1.5 to 4 hours) to those of nefazodone, and may contribute significantly to its effects.

See also
 Serotonin antagonist and reuptake inhibitor

References

5-HT1A agonists
5-HT2A antagonists
Alpha-1 blockers
Antidepressants
Anxiolytics
H1 receptor antagonists
Human drug metabolites
meta-Chlorophenylpiperazines
Secondary alcohols
Serotonin–norepinephrine reuptake inhibitors
Triazoles